Edmond Desbonnet (1867–1953) was a French academic and photographer who championed physical culture. He made physical education fashionable in Belle Époque France through the publication of fitness journals and by opening a chain of exercise clubs.

Journals
La Culture Physique
La Santé par les Sports

Books
La Force Physique: traité d’athlétisme Paris: Berger Levrault & Cie (1901)
Les Rois de la Lutte (1910)
Les Rois de la Force, (1911, The Kings of Strength)

External links
    
Early French Culture Physique photography by Professor Edmond Desbonnet & others

1867 births
1953 deaths
French academics
French photographers
People associated with physical culture
Belle Époque